Pachnaeus opalus, the northern citrus root weevil, is a species of broad-nosed weevil in the family Curculionidae. It is found in North America.

References

Further reading

 
 
 
 
 
 
 

Entiminae
Beetles described in 1807